Eugenio Gerli (15 July 1923 – 2 October 2013) was an Italian architect and designer. In an intense working life spanning more than six decades, Eugenio Gerli explored many different areas of his profession. He built villas, apartment blocks, office blocks, factories, banks and stores, and also restored historic buildings. He often completed his works with custom-made interiors and furniture.This diverse range of projects inspired his industrial design and today many have become icons, like the S83 chair, the PS 142 armchair Clamis, the Jamaica cabinet and the Graphis System.

Biography 

Eugenio Cesare Gerli was born on 15 July 1923 in Milan; his father Guido (London 1892 - Milan 1987) was an English businessman. His mother Luciana Chiesa was the daughter of Eugenio Chiesa (Milan, 18 November 1863 - Giverny, 22 June 1930).

Eugenio Chiesa, Republican Member of Parliament, from 1922 was firmly opposed to fascism. This caused the family all sort of difficulties, culminating in the exile of Eugenio Chiesa in 1926 and the arrest of Guido, later deported to various concentration camps in Italy.

Eugenio married Marta Somarè daughter of art critic Enrico Somarè and granddaughter of painter Cesare Tallone, forebear of a great family of artists including the painter Guido Tallone, the editor and typographer Alberto Tallone and pianoforte builder Cesare Augusto Tallone.

After an initial two years at the Department of Engineering Eugenio switched to studying Architecture at the Milan Politecnico under Piero Portaluppi and Gio Ponti, both leading architects and designers. (graduated in 1949)

Eugenio Gerli integrated his spatial ideas with innovative solutions for custom-made designed interiors. This philosophy, together with his early studies in Engineering, helped him in the development of models for industrial design

His early work was influenced by the works of Frank Lloyd Wright, Alvar Aalto and Charles Eames .

Eugenio Gerli also loved to create a strong bond between Architecture and visual arts, collaborating with artists like Arnaldo Pomodoro, Lucio Fontana, Blasco Mentor, Pietro Cascella, Guido Somarè.

The Exhibition at the Milan Triennale dedicated to Osvaldo Borsani (held from 16 May 2018- to 16 September 2018, designed by Lord Norman Foster and Tommaso Fantoni) included sixteen works of Architecture and Design by Eugenio Gerli. This paid homage to Gerli's work and represented an important contribution to the rediscovery of this "forgotten Master" (Marco Romanelli).

Eugenio's sons Enrico and Guido, both Architects, joined their father in the Studio in 1977 and worked together on all projects.

Main architectural works 

 1950 - Cardiological Clinic Villa Adele Laveno-Mombello where (in collaboration with Mario Cristiani) he designs also the specific technical furniture. adjustable beds and reclining armchairs i
 1954/55 - Ambasciatori Cinema in Milan, including all freestanding furniture as well as integrated lights.
 1955 - Villa at Lago Maggiore - Portovaltravaglia
 1956 - Villa Seralvo - Meda
 1957 - Tecno flagship Store in via Montenapoleone - Milan - with transparent glass floors. Special Prize Formica Domus
 1958 - Apartment for an art collectionist - via Mascagni - Milano
 1959 - Apartment Block - viale Coni Zugna 23 - Milan
 1962/63 - Horizontal Block of country villa-style apartments - Sirtori
 1968/1972 - Restoration and extensions of Art Nouveau Palazzo Castiglioni, Headquarters of Confcommercio (Unione Commercio e Turismo) Palazzo Castiglioni (1903) - Corso Venezia 49 - Milan
 1972 - New Office Block for Headquarters of Confcommercio (Unione Commercio e Turismo) - via Marina - Milan
 1970 - Restaurant El Toulà - Milan
 1971 - Villa Gatti - La Pinetina - Appiano Gentile (Como)
 1972 - Club House – Golf Club La Pinetina - Appiano Gentile (Como)
 1972 - Villa Orlando - La Pinetina - Appiano Gentile (Como)
 1973 - Villa Casale - La Pinetina - Appiano Gentile (Como)
 1974 - Villa Colombo - La Pinetina - Appiano Gentile (Como)
 1962 and 1974 - Headquarters and Factories for Tecno S.p.A. (with Osvaldo Borsani) - Varedo - (Monza/Brianza)
 1974 - Palazzo ARBO - via Bigli 22 - Milan
 1974/78 - Tecno S.p.A. stores in Milan, Rome, Turin, Paris, Naplesi
 1976/77 - ETRO S.p.A. Headquarters - via Spartaco - Milan
 1978 - Penthouse Dome (with Osvaldo Borsani) - Riyadh - SA
 1978 - Canteen for Breda Fucine Factory - Sesto San Giovanni (Milano)
 1979 - Villa Flenda - La Pinetina - Appiano Gentile (Como)
 1982 - Project for EUR Rome Headquarters of Confcommercio (Unione Commercio e Turismo) - (with Arch. Enrico Gerli) - Rome
 1983 - Villa Bonomi in Castel d'Agogna (Pavia)
 1983 - New Office Block for Banca Popolare della Murgia - (with Arch. Enrico Gerli) - Gravina (Bari)
 1984/88 - ETRO Interior Store via Pontaccio - Milan
 1985 - New Office Block for Banca Popolare della Murgia - Corato (Bari)
 1987 - Project for Villa Koskotas on the hills of Athens
 1987/90 - ETRO Flagship Store - via Montenapoleone - Milan
 1988 - Perfumery ETRO via Verri - Milan
 1988 - New Headquarters for Enasco - via del Melangolo - Rome
 1990 - New Headquarters for ETRO S.p.A. - via Spartaco - Milan
 1998 - Private apartment - Monza
 1976/2000 - ETRO Stores in London, Paris, New York, Rome, Singapore, Los Angeles
 2003 - Parlamentino (Small Parliament) - for Confcommercio (Unione Commercio e Turismo) - corso Venezia 49 Milan
 2002/2004 - New Offices - Istituto Centrale delle Banche Popolari - via Cavallotti 14 / via Verziere 11- Milano

E.G. Designer 

Although Eugenio believed he was first and foremost an architect, today, he is remembered primarily for his furniture design. Some of his projects have become design classics and stand in some of the world's most important collections, including the Triennale di Milano, the Centre Pompidou, the MAD Musée des Arts Décoratifs located in the Palais du Louvre's western wing and the Stedelijk Museum in Amsterdam.

As a student, he started experimenting with the use of plywood. He took part in an exhibition at Fede Cheti with an all-plywood chair with three legs.

In 1949, he founded a workshop named "Forma" for the series production of experimental prototypes.

In 1950–52, he worked in collaboration with Mario Cristiani in Cardiological Clinic Villa Adele in Laveno- Mombello, to design general layout and specific technical furniture: adjustable beds and reclining armchairs for medical applications.

From 1952 to 1954, in addition to projects with plywood and "traditional" materials, he began researching and experimenting with a special resin-structured felt.

In 2007, two of the models were selected for the permanent Triennale Collection.

From 1954 to 1956 designed innovative seats for Padua firm Rima including:
 Small Armchair Rima P28 with a metal structure seat with crossing leather stripes, chairback and armrests made of a continuous veneer plywood structure.
 Model P 75 - with Mario Cristiani - revolving small armchair with fusion metal base and car-industry derived rubber revolving hinge joint.
 Sofas with plastic felt backs for Atria of Cinema Ambasciatori.

In 1957, he started a long collaboration with Tecno S.p.A. designing many classical "icons" like the famous GRAPHIS, the " Copernican Revolution" a complete modular system for offices, the small Armchair PS142 Clamis, made of two specular twin bodies, the circular Armchair P28, the Chair S83, the " Butterfly" extendable Table T92, the nut-shell Cocktail Cabinet Jamaica.

Selected industrial design works 
 1956 Butterfly extendable Table with Mario Cristiani - Prize at Fòrmica-Domus competition (re-disegned by Gerli and produced by Tecno with the name T92 in year 1960)
 1957 Bed made of intersecting planes - Prize at Formica-Domus competition.
 1957 Bent plywood dismountable Chair - S3 Tecno (Prototype Gerli 1951).
 1958 Armchair P28 (Trecentosessanta) based on circle
 1962 Series of dismountable Chairs S81- S82- S83
 1963 Coulisse Table T97
 1963 Table T68 : top made with exchangeable elements (with Osvaldo Borsani)
 1963 Tables T69-T102 with jointed fusion central base (with Osvaldo Borsani)
 1963 "Servomuto" revolving Trays
 1963 Bed L79 (with Osvaldo Borsani)
 1964 TableT87 two heighs Table with different aesthetics (Gold medal at XIII Triennale di Milano)
 1965 Bookcase E101 Domino - the getting over the fixed piece of furniture with five modular and linear elements: the beginning of an experiment with volumns, colours and planes that will lead to the revolutionary project GRAPHIS (1967)
 1965 Sofa and Armchair D/P73 Sir
 1966 Bar Cabinet B106 Jamaica - nut shell inspired
 1966 Armchair and Sofa P104 and D104 Jacqueline
 1967 Bed L108 Holland
 1967 GRAPHIS SYSTEM – production 1968 (with Osvaldo Borsani) - the getting over the fixed piece of furniture with only 2 elements to be freely planned (Patented May 16/1972 US3663079 A)
 1969 Revolving bedside Table T128 Revolver
 1968 Plastic small Easy Chair - Margherita
 1969 Upholstered Armchair PS 142 Clamis made of two specular twin bodies (Patented July 18 -1972 - US D224285 S)
 1969 Vases L1- L2- L3
 1975 Bookshelves with sliding glasses E333
 1979 Series P/D 225 - Fixed or modular sofas with wooden structural corners (with Enrico Gerli)
 1984 Office Armchairs P131 (with Guido Gerli)
 1985 Armchair P121 with reclining back (with Enrico Gerli)
 1988 Office Armchairs Aries E,M,O (with Guido Gerli and Centro Progetti Tecno)

Awards 
 Prize at Fòrmica - Domus competition 1956 - Butterfly Table (with Mario Cristiani)
 Prize at Fòrmica-Domus competition 1957 - Bed made of intersecting planes
 Special prize at Vis Securit-Domus competition 1960 - Tecno Flagship Store via Montenapoleone with transparent glass floors
 Gold medal XIII Triennale di Milano - 1964 - TableT87
 Selection  1970 - Graphis System
 Selection Compasso d'Oro ADI 1970 - Table T92

References

Bibliography 
 
 
 
 
 
 

 
 
 
 
 
 
 Giuliana Gramigna, Paola Biondi, Il Design in Italia dell'arredamento domestico, Torino/London, Umberto Allemandi &C, 1999,

External links

 Centre Pompidou:  https://www.centrepompidou.fr/  (Eugenio Gerli) -
 https://www.centrepompidou.fr/cpv/ressource.action?param.id=FR_R-1a465fd73e1b3fd66ef5fedc1f092e1&param.idSource=FR_O-bfaba549ea3cae5f1c840babbd0cb26
 Triennale di Milano: https://www.triennale.org/en/collection/
 Triennale di Milano . Design Museum . Collezione permanente del Design italiano https://web.archive.org/web/20190130000013/http://www.triennale.org/categoria_collezione/collezione-permanente-del-design-italiano/
 MUSÉE DES ARTS DÉCORATIFS: http://collections.lesartsdecoratifs.fr/chaise-s-83/
 https://www.tecnospa.com/en-us/company/architects-and-designers/eugenio-gerli
 Stedelijk Museum Amsterdam :  https://www.stedelijk.nl/en
 Gerli Design: https://www.gerlidesign.eu/
Le Centre Pompidou expose sa collection de design italien à l'Hôtel des Arts de Toulon (francetvinfo.fr)
Futurissimo | L'utopie du design italien | Boutique du Centre Pompidou

1923 births
2013 deaths
20th-century Italian architects
Architects from Milan
Italian furniture designers
Italian designers
Italian industrial designers
Polytechnic University of Milan alumni